The 2004 Valdosta State Blazers football team was an American football team that represented Valdosta State University as a member of the Gulf South Conference (GSC) during the 2004 NCAA Division II football season. In their fifth year under head coach Chris Hatcher, the team compiled a 13–1 record (9–0 against conference opponents) and won the GSC championship. The team advanced to the NCAA Division II playoffs and defeated , 36–31, in the championship game.

Two Valdosta player were honored by the Associated Press on its 2004 Little All-America team: kicker Will Rhody (first team) and offensive lineman Torry Howard (third team). Other key players included quarterback Fabian Walker and running back Vincent Brown. 

The Blazers played their home games at Bazemore–Hyder Stadium in Valdosta, Georgia.

Schedule

References

Valdosta State
Valdosta State Blazers football seasons
NCAA Division II Football Champions
Gulf South Conference football champion seasons
Valdosta State Blazers football